Lynn Township is one of ten townships in Posey County, Indiana. As of the 2000 census, its population was 945.

History
Lynn Township was organized in 1817. The township bears the name of Dan Lynn, a state legislator.

Adjacent Townships
 Indiana
 Posey County
 Black Township (South)
 Center Township (Northeast)
 Harmony Township (North)
 Marrs Township (Single Point)
 Robinson Township (East)
 Illinois
 White County, Illinois
 Emma Township (Southwest)
 Phillips Township (Northwest)

Unincorporated Places
Savah
Solitude
Springfield

References

External links
 Indiana Township Association
 United Township Association of Indiana

Townships in Posey County, Indiana
Townships in Indiana